Ealees Brook is a water course in Greater Manchester named after the Ealees area of Littleborough. It flows northwards from the Ealees Valley to the River Roch in Littleborough.

Tributaries

Shore Lane Brook
Hollingworth Brook
Brearley Brook
Longden End Brook (Hollingworth Lake)

Rivers of the Metropolitan Borough of Rochdale
Littleborough, Greater Manchester
1